Girkar  is a surname. Notable people with the surname include:

 Nilesh Girkar, Indian filmmaker
 Vijay Girkar, Indian politician

Surnames of Indian origin